Ganehdar or Genehdar or Ganahdar or Ganeh Dar or Gonah Dar may refer to:
 Ganehdar, Mahabad
 Ganeh Dar, Piranshahr
 Ganahdar, Lajan, Piranshahr County